Tomis is a genus of South American jumping spiders that was first described by F.O. Pickard-Cambridge in 1901. The genus Pseudattulus, erected by Lodovico di Caporiacco in 1947, was formerly considered distinct with two species, but was placed in synonymy in 2020 when Tomis was re-separated from Sitticus (now Attulus).

Species
, the World Spider Catalog accepted the following extant species:
Tomis beieri (Caporiacco, 1955) (syn. Pseudattulus beieri) – Venezuela
Tomis canus Galiano, 1977 (syn. Sitticus canus) – Peru
Tomis kratochvili (Caporiacco, 1947) (syn. Pseudattulus kratochvili) – Venezuela, Guyana
Tomis manabita W. Maddison, 2020 – Ecuador
Tomis mazorcanus (Chamberlin, 1920) (syn. Sitticus mazorcanus) – Peru
Tomis mona (Bryant, 1947) – Puerto Rico
Tomis palpalis F. O. Pickard-Cambridge, 1901 (type species) (syn. Sitticus palpalis) – Mexico, Argentina
Tomis pavidus (Bryant, 1942) – Virgin Is.
Tomis phaleratus (Galiano & Baert, 1990) (syn. Sitticus phaleratus) – Ecuador (Galapagos Is.)
Tomis pintanus (Edwards & Baert, 2018) (syn. Sitticus pintanus) – Ecuador (Galapagos Is.)
Tomis tenebricus (Galiano & Baert, 1990) (syn. Sitticus tenebricus) – Ecuador (Galapagos Is.)
Tomis trisetosus (Edwards & Baert, 2018) (syn. Sitticus trisetosus) – Ecuador (Galapagos Is.)
Tomis uber (Galiano & Baert, 1990) (syn. Sitticus uber) – Ecuador (Galapagos Is.)
Tomis vanvolsemorum (Baert, 2011) (syn. Sitticus vanvolsemorum) – Ecuador (Galapagos Is.)
Tomis welchi (Gertsch & Mulaik, 1936) (syn. Sitticus welchi) – United States

References

Salticidae
Salticidae genera